Shouqi Yueche (also Shouqi Limousine & Chauffeur) is a Chinese vehicle for hire company and the closest domestic competitor of market leader DiDi. 
It has 113 million registered users and is active in over 130 Chinese cities as of September 2020. 

Shouqi's strategic focus is on the upscale rides niche, while also competing with DiDi in the mass market and strategic partnerships. It has a partnership with Meituan, allowing 477 million Meituan users to book Shouqi rides directly.

References

Transport software
Chinese brands
Carsharing
Ridesharing companies of China
Road transport in China
Online companies of China
Transport companies of China